William Robert Hammond (2 July 1886 – 13 January 1960) was a British road racing cyclist who competed in the 1912 Summer Olympics.

He was born in Eastbourne, Sussex England, and was part of the team which won the silver medal in the Team road race. In the individual road race he finished 22nd.

Hammond was the son of David Hammond, a painter, and Emily, a laundress. At 15, he was a compass maker in Bexleyheath, Kent.

References

External links
William Hammond's profile at databaseOlympics

1886 births
1960 deaths
English male cyclists
Cyclists at the 1912 Summer Olympics
Olympic cyclists of Great Britain
Olympic silver medallists for Great Britain
Olympic medalists in cycling
Sportspeople from Eastbourne
Medalists at the 1912 Summer Olympics